Jacob Burnet (sometimes spelled Burnett) (February 22, 1770May 10, 1853) was an American jurist and statesman from Ohio. He served as a U.S. Senator.

Early life
Burnet was born in Newark, New Jersey, the son of Dr. William Burnet. He graduated from the College of New Jersey in 1791, studied law, moved to the Northwest Territory and settled in Cincinnati in 1796. He was admitted to the bar in 1796.

Political career

He was a member of the Territorial councils of Ohio from 1799 to 1802 and served in the Ohio State House from 1814 to 1816. Burnet was considered the "father of the Ohio constitution" and was an associate justice of the Ohio Supreme Court from 1821 until his resignation in 1828 to serve as United States Senator. He was elected to the U.S. Senate to fill the vacancy caused by the resignation of William Henry Harrison. He served in the Senate from December 10, 1828, to March 3, 1831.

Burnet was elected a member of the American Antiquarian Society in 1815.

After leaving Congress, he resumed the practice of law and served as president of Cincinnati College and the Medical College of Ohio. Burnet's "Notes on the Early Settlement of the North-western Territory" is a primary reference on the early Northwest.

He resided in a mansion on the northwest corner of Seventh and Elm streets in Downtown Cincinnati. Burnet died in Cincinnati on May 10, 1853, aged 83. He is interred in Spring Grove Cemetery in Cincinnati.

Family life
Burnet's half-brother David G. Burnet was the first president of the Republic of Texas.

Notes

References

External links

Congressional Biography

1770 births
1853 deaths
Ohio lawyers
Members of the Ohio House of Representatives
Northwest Territory officials
Justices of the Ohio Supreme Court
Politicians from Newark, New Jersey
Politicians from Cincinnati
United States senators from Ohio
Burials at Spring Grove Cemetery
National Republican Party United States senators
Ohio National Republicans
19th-century American politicians
Princeton University alumni
Members of the American Antiquarian Society
Lawyers from Newark, New Jersey
19th-century American lawyers